Clinton Community School District is a public school district headquartered in Clinton, Iowa, serving that city and being located in Clinton County.

Schools
 Secondary
 Clinton High School
 Clinton Middle School
 Primary
 Bluff Elementary School
 Eagle Heights Elementary School
 Jefferson Elementary School
 Whittier Elementary School

The Eagle Heights school replaced the former Elijah Buell and Horace Mann schools. By 2008, the district was auctioning off the schools.

See also
List of school districts in Iowa

References

External links
 Clinton Community School District
School districts in Iowa
Education in Clinton County, Iowa
School districts established in 1835
1835 establishments in Michigan Territory